Gary Roberts may refer to:

Sports

Association football
 Gary Roberts (footballer, born 1960), Welsh football forward and winger
 Gary Roberts (footballer, born 1984), English football attacking midfielder 
 Gary Roberts (footballer, born 1987), English football playmaker

Other sports
 Gary Roberts (American football) (born 1946), American football offensive guard
 Gary Roberts (ice hockey) (born 1966), Canadian ice hockey player

Others
 Gary Roberts (radio broadcaster) (born 1952), Australian radio broadcaster
 Gary R. Roberts, Dean of the Indiana University School of Law

See also
 Garry Roberts (1950–2022), Irish guitarist